Stephanie Egger (born August 12, 1988) is a Swiss female mixed martial artist who competes in the Bantamweight division of the Ultimate Fighting Championship.

Background
Egger is a judo black belt, having won the 2010 European U23 Championships and was the Swiss Judo champion in the +63 kg category in 2011, 2012, and 2013. Egger was also won the ADCC European Trial in 2019 at 60 kg. The longtime black belt competed in the 2019 ADCC World Championships where she went to a decision with Gabi Garcia.

In addition to the many hours of training every day, Stephanie Egger works in the family restaurant in Berneck.

Mixed martial arts career

Early career
After winning her first two bouts against Judith Ruis and Mara Romero Borella via first round stoppage, her next fight was on November 18, 2016 at Invicta FC 20: Evinger vs. Kunitskaya against Alexa Conners and she lost the fight via a split decision.

Egger faced Eeva Siiskonen at Buddy MMA Clash 2 on March 31, 2018. She won the bout via TKO in the first round.

Egger faced Reina Miura, in a 138 lbs catchweight bout, at Rizin 17 on July 28, 2019. Egger won the fight by unanimous decision.

Ultimate Fighting Championship
Egger, as a replacement for Bea Malecki, made her UFC debut against Tracy Cortez on October 11, 2020 at UFC Fight Night: Moraes vs. Sandhagen. Egger lost the fight via unanimous decision.

Egger was scheduled to face Sarah Alpar on May 22, 2021 at UFC Fight Night: Font vs. Garbrandt. However, Egger pulled out due to undisclosed reasons in the week leading up to the event.

Egger faced Shanna Young on October 2, 2021 at UFC Fight Night: Santos vs. Walker. She won the fight via technical knockout in round two.

Egger faced Jessica-Rose Clark on  February 19, 2022  at UFC Fight Night 201. She won the fight via an armbar submission in the first round. The win earned Egger her first Performance of the Night bonus award.

Egger faced Mayra Bueno Silva on August 6, 2022 at UFC on ESPN 40. She lost the fight via an armbar submission in round one.

Egger faced Ailin Perez, replacing Zarah Fairn Dos Santos, on September 3, 2022  at UFC Fight Night 209. She won the fight via a rear-naked choke in round two.

Championships and accomplishments

Grappling
 2016: ADCC European Championship —  in +60 kg category (Mainz)
 2019: ADCC European Championship —  in +60 kg class (Poznań)

Judo
European U23 Judo Championships
2010 European U23 Judo Championships —  in –70 kg category (Sarajevo)

Mixed martial arts
Ultimate Fighting Championship
Performance of the Night (One time)

Mixed martial arts record

|Win
|align=center| 8–3
|Ailín Pérez
|Submission (rear-naked choke)
|UFC Fight Night: Gane vs. Tuivasa
|
|align=center|2
|align=center|4:54
|Paris, France
|
|-
|Loss
|align=center| 7–3
|Mayra Bueno Silva
|Submission (armbar)
|UFC on ESPN: Santos vs. Hill
|
|align=center|1
|align=center|1:17
|Las Vegas, Nevada, United States
|
|-
|Win
|align=center| 7–2
|Jessica-Rose Clark
|Submission (armbar)
|UFC Fight Night: Walker vs. Hill
|
|align=center|1
|align=center|3:44
|Las Vegas, Nevada, United States
|
|-
| Win
| align=center| 6–2
| Shanna Young
| TKO (elbow)
| UFC Fight Night: Santos vs. Walker
| 
| align=center| 2
| align=center| 2:22
| Las Vegas, Nevada, United States
|
|-
| Loss
| align=center| 5–2
| Tracy Cortez
|Decision (unanimous)
|UFC Fight Night: Moraes vs. Sandhagen 
|
|align=center|3
|align=center|5:00
|Abu Dhabi, United Arab Emirates
|  
|-
| Win
| align=center|5–1
|Cinja Kiefer
|Submission (rear-naked choke)
|Buddy MMA Clash 3
|
|align=center|1
|align=center|2:41
| St. Gallen, Switzerland
|
|-
| Win
| align=center|4–1
|Reina Miura
| Decision (unanimous)
| Rizin 17
| 
| align=center| 3
| align=center| 5:00
| Saitama, Japan
| 
|-
| Win
| align=center| 3–1
| Eeva Siiskonen
|TKO (punches)
|Buddy MMA Clash 2
|
|align=center|1
|align=center|2:07
|St. Gallen, Switzerland
|
|-
| Loss
| align=center|2–1
| Alexa Conners
| Decision (split)
| Invicta FC 20: Evinger vs. Kunitskaya
| 
| align=center| 3
| align=center| 5:00
| Kansas City, Missouri, United States
|
|-
| Win
| align=center|2–0
| Mara Romero Borella
|TKO (corner stoppage)
|Arena Fighting Games
| 
|align=center|1
|align=center|5:00
|Milan, Italy
|
|-
| Win
| align=center|1–0
| Judith Ruis
| Submission (armbar)
|Respect Fighting Championship 14
|
|align=center|1
|align=center|1:30
|Karlsruhe, Germany
|

See also 
 List of current UFC fighters
 List of female mixed martial artists

References

External links 
  
 

1988 births
Living people
Swiss female mixed martial artists
Bantamweight mixed martial artists
Mixed martial artists utilizing judo
Swiss female judoka
Ultimate Fighting Championship female fighters
Sportspeople from St. Gallen (city)
21st-century Swiss women